Cameraman Gangatho Rambabu is a 2012 Indian Telugu-language political action film written and directed by Puri Jagannadh. The film stars Pawan Kalyan, Tamanna, and Gabriela Bertante in lead roles, while Prakash Raj and Kota Srinivasa Rao played supporting roles. Mani Sharma composed the score, Shyam K. Naidu directed the cinematography, and S. R. Shekhar oversaw editing. It was the second collaboration between Kalyan and Jagannadh after Badri (2000). The film was released on 18 October 2012.

The film also marks Puri Jagannadh and Pawan Kalyan's collaboration after 12 years. The film was released worldwide on 18 October 2012 to mixed reviews from critics and audiences.
Later the film was dubbed in Malayalam as Jananayakan and Tamil as Makkalveeran and it was also dubbed and released in Hindi as Mera Target in 2015.

Plot 
Rambabu (Pawan Kalyan) is a hot-blooded, short-tempered mechanic who has a kind heart, as well as a tendency to react to various social incidents shown or published in the electronic media. After studying his personality, Ganga (Tamannaah Bhatia), a cameraman from NC Channel, offers him a job as a journalist, and he accepts it. Meanwhile, Ex-Chief Minister Jawahar Naidu (Kota Srinivasa Rao) tries to collapse the government and regain the post of CM. He is strongly supported by his son Rana Babu (Prakash Raj), a newbie to politics. Meanwhile, a reputed journalist Dasaradh Ram (Surya Kumar) supplies proof of the scams and atrocities committed by Jawahar Naidu, only to be brutally murdered by Rana Babu.

Although everyone, including the police, is aware that Rana Babu is the murderer, he is not held accountable. Rambabu valiantly opposes him and gets him arrested. However, Rana Babu is released from jail with the help of his political contacts, and he challenges Rambabu to become the CM by using the media. A war starts between Rambabu and Rana Babu when the latter enters politics. For gaining political mileage, Rana Babu starts a movement opposing the presence of other states people in Andhra Pradesh and makes it a big movement and even injuring Rambabu severely, but he is rescued by Smitha (Gabriela Bertante), who works for a rival news channel. Rambabu later joins Smitha's news channel after getting discharged from the hospital.

Rambabu tricks Rana Babu into making some controversial statements on air, thus destroying the momentum of the movement. For making his position in politics strong, he makes Jawahar Naidu deliver his last speech and then murders him, which is recorded by Rana Babu's driver, who later calls Rambabu and Smitha to show them the video. Few moments later, Smitha arrives and shoots Rambabu, steals the video, and makes a deal with Rana Babu to disclose the whole for a hefty price. With the support of the young blood influenced by his speech, Rambabu reaches the building where Rana Babu hosted a party for his colleagues.

Rambabu sends a message to the police commissioner that Rana Babu's guests should vacate the building to avoid being killed by the people along with Rana Babu. Before leaving, Smitha orders to telecast the video, only to be murdered by Rana Babu. Rana Babu comes outside with his pistol and shoots Rambabu. The film ends with Rana Babu dying by the stampede of the people and Rambabu reaching the ambulance accompanied by Ganga.

Cast 

 Pawan Kalyan as Rambabu, a mechanic-turned-journalist
 Tamannaah Bhatia as Ganga, NC Channel cameraman and Rambabu's love interest
 Gabriela Bertante as Smitha, rival news channel worker
 Prakash Raj as Rana Prathap Naidu, Jawahar Naidu's son
 Kota Srinivasa Rao as Ex-Chief Minister Jawahar Naidu, the opposition leader
 Brahmanandam as Bobby
 Nassar as Chandrasekhara Reddy, the Chief Minister of Andhra Pradesh
 Surya Kumar as Dasaradh Ram
 Ali as SRK
 Dharmavarapu Subramanyam as MD
 M. S. Narayana as Rambabu's uncle
 Tanikella Bharani as Rana's uncle
 Prudhvi Raj as MLA
 Scarlett Mellish Wilson as a bar dancer in the song "Joramochindhi"

Controversy 
The film led to a massive political tension in the state of Andhra Pradesh with the film's characters being compared to the political leaders during the Telangana Movement and the Andhra politics during the tenure of Y. S. Rajasekhara Reddy as the CM.RS politburo member. D.Sharavan said that deleting some scenes from the film would not pacify the people of Telangana and demanded a total ban on its screening.

The Telugu Desam Party (TDP) and Dravida Munnetra Kazhagam (DMK) also sought a ban on the movie, saying that it not only showed their leaders in poor light but also ridiculed their chiefs N. Chandrababu Naidu and Karunanidhi. TDP activists staged a protest demanding a ban on the movie in Kurnool district of the Rayalaseema region. To end the controversy, the makers of Cameraman Gangatho Rambabu were forced to remove the objectionable content from the film. Finally, Puri Jagannadh said no references were made about T-movement nor TDP chief Chandrababu Naidu (Bolli dialogue) and he cannot do anything if people come with their own interpretation of the scenes.

Production

Development 
Pawan Kalyan had previously worked with Puri Jagannadh in Badri, which also was Puri's debut movie.  On 18 January 2012, Puri Jagannath announced on his Twitter account that Pawan had agreed to do a film with him and filming would begin in mid-2012. On 25 January 2012 Puri announced that the film would be produced by DVV Danayya on Universal Media banner and that filming would begin in May 2012 after Pawan completed filming for Gabbar Singh. On 10 February 2012, Puri Jagannath revealed on his Twitter that he was in Bangkok and had completed writing the first half of the film. He also announced that the film would be titled Cameraman Gangatho Rambabu and released the logo of the film on his Twitter. It was reported that Puri has completed writing the script. The film was officially launched on 14 March 2012 at Puri Jagannath's office in Hyderabad. It was soon announced that S. R. Shekhar, who worked for Puri's previous four movies, will be handling the film's editing and Shyam K. Naidu will work as the cinematographer. It was also reported that Mani Sharma would give the soundtrack for the film. This would be Puri Jagannath's 25th film.

Casting 
It was announced on 14 March 2012 that Prakash Raj, Brahmanandam, Ali, Tanikella Bharani, and Kota Srinivasa Rao were cast for vital roles in the film. It was reported that Pawan Kalyan would be seen in the role of a news reporter and the female lead will be played by Tamanna. Gabriela Bertante, who performed an item number in Puri Jagannadh's Devudu Chesina Manushulu, was chosen to play the second female lead role. Scarlett Wilson has been roped for an item song.

Filming 
Filming was set to begin in the second week of May 2012 after Puri finished Devudu Chesina Manushulu. It was also reported that a major part of the filming would take place in Hyderabad. The first schedule of the film started on 15 June 2012 at Saradhi Studios and shifted to Padmalaya.The police faced a tough situation to handle the crowd at the shooting spot. The second schedule of the film began on 9 July 2012. By August, filming of the talkie part was completed and the shooting was wrapped up in September after the remaining (two) songs in the film were shot. A fight scene was shot at Ramoji Rao City. Puri originally planned to shoot climax with real-life Pawan fans, but due to the weather, it was postponed. A set resembling that of a media office was erected at Saradhi studios for 30 million by art director CHINNA.

Distribution rights 
"Exilir India Entertainments" company secured the theatrical distribution rights for Australia and New Zealand. The theatrical distribution rights of the film for the Vizag region were sold for  41 million. Telugu film production company 14 Reels Entertainment secured the theatrical screening rights of the film for Krishna District.

Release 
The teaser on the making of the film was released on 2 September 2012. The film has got a U/A certificate without any cuts from the Central Board of Film Certification on 11 October 2012. The film was released on 18 October 2012 in over 1600 screens. On the second day of its release following protests by Telangana supporters against objectionable scenes which they claimed hurt their sentiments and allegedly belittling the pro-Telangana movement, the screening of the film was stopped in many theatres across Telangana region. As the controversy surrounding objectionable scenes in the film continues to affect its screening in several Telangana districts, a committee constituted by the Government has recommended cuts and modifications of nine scenes. The film was also dubbed and released in Hindi as Mera Target in 2015.

Critical reception 
The film received mixed reviews.  
The Times of India gave 3.5 out of 5 stars and stated that "The first half of the film goes on a fruity note while the film's racy second half keeps you going". Rediff wrote: "With Cameraman Gangatho Rambabu, Puri Jagannadh is trying to look for an idealistic situation". The Way2movies website gave a rating of 3.25/5 for the film and stated that "A sincere attempt by Puri Jagannadh. Watch Pawan Kalyan's terrific on-screen presence in Cameraman Gangatho Rambabu". Idlebrain gave 3.25/5 and wrote: Strengths of the film are Pawan Kalyan's explosive performance and Puri Jagan's superb characterization/dialogues. On the flip side, the holistic approach and strong villain characterization is missing in the film. There is enough firepower in the movie to make it commercially work. The 123telugu website also gave a rating 
3.25/5 for the film and stated that 'Cameraman Gangatho Rambabu’ is a movie that works primarily due to Pawan Kalyan's sheer force and powerful on-screen presence. A good second half, solid punch dialogues and a terrific performance from Pawan elevate the movie. A better script and more involving characters would have helped the movie. The film will be a great watch for those who are interested in politics, and a decent one for regular movie lovers.". The SuperGoodMovies website also gave a 3.25/5 for the film and stated that "Go and Watch Cameraman Gangatho Rambabu for Powerstar Pawan Kalyan's best performance. Cameraman Gangatho Rambabuis packaged with full of entertainment. A hit for Pawan Kalyan this year". The Oneindia Entertainment website has stated that what strikes viewers is the way Puri has presented this subject on screen. Pawan Kalyan's performance stands out in it. It is a good treat for both class and mass audience, and it is a must-watch film for the Powerstar fans. Telugu cinema wrote: "Cameraman Gangatho Rambabu is a treat for Pawan Kalyan's fans and for Puri's fans, with its central theme actually going above and beyond the star and the star-director".

Box office 
The film started well at the box office and collected 500 million(Gross) but dropped after and the film became Above Average flick at the box office. The film has completed 50 days in 72 centers on 6 December 2012 in Andhra Pradesh.
Cameraman Gangatho Rambabu Collected (Share) day 1 collection and it collected 350 million (share)in its lifetime.

Home media 
The VCD's, DVD's and Blu-ray discs of the film were released into the market through Aditya Video company on 17 January 2013.

Soundtrack 

The soundtrack of the film was released without audio launch through Aditya Music label on 2 October 2012. The music of the film was composed by Mani Sharma collaborating with Puri Jagan and with Pawan for the second time. The album consists of six songs. The lyrics for all songs were penned by Bhaskarabhatla. The audio songs of the film were well received by the audience.

Awards 
2nd South Indian International Movie Awards
SIIMA Award for Best Female Playback Singer (Telugu) – Geetha Madhuri for "Melikalu"
TSR – TV9 National Film Awards
Tamannaah Bhatia for Best Heroine

References

External links 
 

2012 films
2010s Telugu-language films
2012 action films
Indian action films
Journalism adapted into films
2012 masala films
Political action films
Films directed by Puri Jagannadh
Films scored by Mani Sharma